Juan I is the name of:

Juan I of Portugal (1358–1433)
 Juan I of Castile (1358–1390)
Juan I of Aragon (1350–1396)

See also
John I (disambiguation)
Jean I (disambiguation)